Misk'i (Aymara and Quechua for 'sweet' or 'honey', also spelled Mizque) is a mountain in the Bolivian Andes which reaches a height of approximately . It is located in the Cochabamba Department, Carrasco Province, Pocona Municipality. It lies at the Wanaku Mayu ("guanaco river").

References 

Mountains of Cochabamba Department